The Orthodox Church in America (OCA) is an Eastern Orthodox Church in North America that has recognized autocephalous jurisdiction by some Eastern Orthodox Churches.

Orthodox Church in America or Orthodox Church of America may also refer to:

Eastern Orthodoxy
 Eastern Orthodoxy in North America, referring to jurisdictions of all Eastern Orthodox Churches in North America
 Eastern Orthodox Church in the United States of America, referring to jurisdictions of all Eastern Orthodox Churches in the United States of America
 Greek Orthodox Church in the United States of America, referring to jurisdictions of the Patriarchate of Constantinople in the United States of America
 Serbian Orthodox Church in North and South America, referring to all Serbian Orthodox Church jurisdictions in the Americas
 Antiochian Orthodox Christian Archdiocese of North America, the Greek Orthodox Church of Antioch in the U.S. and Canada
Ukrainian Orthodox Church of the USA -  is a jurisdiction of the Ecumenical Patriarchate in the United States.

Oriental Orthodoxy
 Oriental Orthodox Church in North America, communion of all Oriental Orthodox Churches in North America
 Oriental Orthodox Church in the United States of America, communion of all Oriental Orthodox Churches in the United States of America
 Oriental Orthodox Church in South America, communion of all Oriental Orthodox Churches in South America
 Coptic Orthodox Church in South America, referring to all Coptic Orthodox Church jurisdictions in South America
 Coptic Orthodox Church in North America, referring to all Coptic Orthodox Church jurisdictions in North America
 Coptic Orthodox Church in the United States, referring to all Coptic Orthodox Church jurisdictions in the U.S.

Other churches
 Orthodox-Catholic Church of America
 American Orthodox Catholic Church
 Moorish Orthodox Church of America
 Holy Orthodox Church in North America
 Ethiopian Orthodox Coptic Church of North and South America

See also 
 America (disambiguation)
 Orthodox Church (disambiguation)